Juan Antonio "Juanín" García Lorenzana (born 28 August 1977 in León) is a Spanish handball player. He currently plays for CB Ademar León.

He participated at the 2008 Summer Olympics in Beijing as a member of the Spain men's national handball team. The team won a bronze medal, defeating Croatia.

References

External links
 
 
 
 

1977 births
Living people
Sportspeople from León, Spain
Spanish male handball players
Liga ASOBAL players
FC Barcelona Handbol players
Handball players at the 2008 Summer Olympics
Olympic handball players of Spain
Olympic bronze medalists for Spain
CB Ademar León players
Olympic medalists in handball
Medalists at the 2008 Summer Olympics
Mediterranean Games gold medalists for Spain
Competitors at the 2005 Mediterranean Games
Mediterranean Games medalists in handball
21st-century Spanish people